"I Could Be Happy" is a song by Scottish new wave band Altered Images, released as the first single from their second album, Pinky Blue. Their second top-10 hit in the UK, the song peaked at number seven in December 1981, and remained on the chart for 12 weeks. It also reached the top 40 in Australia, Ireland, and New Zealand and was their first and only single to chart in the United States, on the Billboard Dance Club Songs chart at number 45 in April 1982.

Music video
The music video for this song was a brief mainstay on MTV in its early days. The band members are shown holding different pastel pieces and playing them like they were their musical instruments, and singer Clare Grogan is shown singing the "I could be happy, I could be happy" part in scenes where those lyrics are on the screen with a dot weirdly moving around, but hitting each syllable in time. Near the end, the band members put their pieces down to show it draws a very colorful happy face, then the video ends with Grogan riding out the song with the band playing their real instruments. (MTV initially accidentally said the song was from their Happy Birthday album.)

Track listings
7-inch single
A. "I Could Be Happy"
B. "Insects"

12-inch single
A1. "I Could Be Happy"
B1. "Insects"
B2. "Disco Pop Stars"

Charts

Weekly charts

Year-end chart

Certifications

References

1981 songs
1981 singles
Altered Images songs
Epic Records singles
Portrait Records singles
Song recordings produced by Martin Rushent